The Mitsui Outlet Park Linkou is an outlet store in Linkou District, New Taipei City, Taiwan. With a total of 220 brands, construction of the mall started in April 2014 and it officially opened on January 27, 2016. It is Mitsui Fudosan's third overseas base.

Facilities
The outlet is owned and operated by Mitsui & Co. Taiwan Ltd. It has a mix of 220 brands and various restaurants. Some of the shops include Shiatzy Chen, Timberland, Superdry, Nike, and Puma. The cinema inside the mall has a total of 9 theaters with 1772 seats, including a 4DX theater and two new humanistic concept theaters "Mappa". It adopts a full 4K theater specification to achieve image projection quality.

Location
The outlet mall is located in close proximity to the Linkou metro station along the Taoyuan International Airport MRT.

Gallery

See also
 List of tourist attractions in Taiwan
 Mitsui Outlet Park Taichung
 Linkou District

References

External links

 Mitsui Outlet Park Linkou Official Website

2016 establishments in Taiwan
Outlet malls in Taiwan
Shopping malls in New Taipei
Shopping malls established in 2016
Mitsui Fudosan